The 1988 Belgian Open was a women's tennis tournament played on outdoor clay courts in Brussels, Belgium and was part of the Category 1 tier of the 1988 WTA Tour. It was the second edition of the tournament ran from 11 July until 17 July 1988. Fourth-seeded Arantxa Sánchez won the singles final.

Finals

Singles

 Arantxa Sánchez defeated  Raffaella Reggi 6–0, 7–5
 It was Sánchez Vicario's only title of the year and the 2nd of her career.

Doubles

 Mercedes Paz /  Tine Scheuer-Larsen defeated  Katerina Maleeva /  Raffaella Reggi 7–6(7–3), 6–1
 It was Paz's 2nd title of the year and the 10th of her career. It was Scheuer-Larsen's 1st title of the year and the 3rd of her career.

References

External links
 ITF tournament edition details
 Tournament draws

Belgian Open
Belgian Open (tennis)
Belgian Open
Belgian Open
1988 in Belgian tennis